Henry Clay Payne (November 23, 1843 – October 4, 1904) was U.S. Postmaster General from 1902 to 1904 under Pres. Theodore Roosevelt. He died in office and was buried at Forest Home Cemetery in Milwaukee, Wisconsin. He was also a chairman of the Republican National Committee.

Biography
Payne was born in Ashfield, Franklin County, Massachusetts, on November 23, 1843, though his birth is sometimes listed incorrectly as September 23.  He spent his youth in Massachusetts, and attempted to enlist for the Union Army, but he was rejected from service due to poor health.  In 1859, he was graduated from the Academy of Shelburne Falls.  In 1863, he moved to Milwaukee, Wisconsin, where he found work as a dry goods merchant.

In 1872 he began his political career with the Young Men's Republican Club of Milwaukee County.  He worked his way up to become secretary and then chairman for the organization.  In 1876, Payne was appointed Postmaster of Milwaukee, a position he held for the next ten years.  He transferred his organizational skills to his next position as president of Wisconsin Telephone Company in 1885, and served as director for the First National Bank of Milwaukee.

Railroads 
Payne became a lobbyist for the railroad industry, described by long-time opponent Robert La Follette, Sr. as “the most effective railroad lobbyist I ever knew.” Starting in 1890 he helped Henry Villard acquire all the cars Milwaukee streetcar system for Villard's North American Company of New Jersey. Villard created a new system that combined several of the earlier horsecar, steam dummy, and streetcar lines into one electric streetcar system, The Milwaukee Electric Railway and Light Company. Payne was its vice-president as well as president of the Milwaukee and Northern Railroad and other enterprises controlled by Villard.  In his duties as vice-president of the Milwaukee Electric Railway & Light Co., Payne instituted free park concerts at many of Milwaukee's parks, including Lake Park, but fought Milwaukee's government in the courts and in the legislature. In 1893 he was elected president of the American Street Railway Association; and later in August 1893, he was appointed receiver for the bankrupt Northern Pacific Railway.

In 1896, Payne refused to provide a one-cent-an-hour pay raise which had allegedly been promised to unionized TMER&L workers. This set off a bitter strike and boycott; the company hired hundreds of scabs, and broke both the strike and the union, creating an adversarial relationship between TMER&L Co. and workers (including the city's powerful "sewer Socialists") for many years to come; the company would not be unionized again until after a 1934 strike. During this period, Payne continued to promulgate expanded streetcar and interurban services in the region, including a controversial 30-year extension of their franchise, a deal cut with Milwaukee Mayor David Rose and the Milwaukee Common Council under what some considered corrupt circumstances.

He also engaged in real estate development, such as the 1897 "Payne's Park Addition" to North Milwaukee, fed by expanded streetcar lines running past what has been described as "two miles of vacant fields" and ending a few blocks past the street Payne had named after Villard in 1892.

Death 
He died on October 4, 1904.

References

Attributions

Further reading

External links

|-

1843 births
1904 deaths
19th-century American railroad executives
19th-century American merchants
20th-century American politicians
Burials in Wisconsin
Businesspeople from Wisconsin
Northern Pacific Railway people
People from Ashfield, Massachusetts
Politicians from Milwaukee
Republican National Committee chairs
Theodore Roosevelt administration cabinet members
United States Postmasters General
Wisconsin Republicans